Rubén Andrés Cano Martínez (born 5 February 1951) is a Spanish retired footballer who played as a striker.

He appeared in 228 La Liga matches over eight seasons (93 goals) with two teams, mainly Atlético Madrid.

Cano represented Spain at the 1978 World Cup.

Club career
Born in San Rafael, Mendoza, Argentina to Spanish parents, Cano started his professional career with Buenos Aires-based Club Atlético Atlanta, remaining four years with the team. In 1974, he returned to the land of his ancestors and joined Elche CF, making his La Liga debut on 14 September 1974 in a 1–0 home win against Atlético Madrid and ending his first season with six goals in 32 games as the Valencians finished in eighth position.

In the 1976 off-season, Cano signed for precisely Atlético Madrid, scoring 19 times in his first year – fifth-best in the competition – as the Colchoneros won the national championship, one point ahead of FC Barcelona. He added a combined 40 in the following two seasons, and formed an efficient forward partnership during his spell with another Argentine-born player, Rubén Ayala.

After only 12 matches (one goal) in 1981–82, the 32-year-old Cano left Atlético and joined CD Tenerife in the third division, helping the Canary Islands side promote in his debut season and remaining with them for a further two second level campaigns; he closed out his career at the age of 36 after a couple of years with another club in Madrid, second-tier Rayo Vallecano.

International career
Cano chose to represent Spain internationally, going on to win 12 caps in two years. His debut occurred on 16 April 1977 in a 1978 FIFA World Cup qualifier against Romania (0–1 loss in Bucharest); also in that competition, he scored the game's only goal in Belgrade on 30 November to help his adopted nation defeat Yugoslavia and top its group.

Picked for the finals in Argentina, Cano appeared in the 1–2 defeat to Austria, in an eventual group stage exit.

Honours
Atlético Madrid
La Liga: 1976–77

See also
List of Spain international footballers born outside Spain

References

External links

1951 births
Living people
Argentine people of Spanish descent
Argentine emigrants to Spain
Spanish footballers
Argentine footballers
Association football forwards
Argentine Primera División players
Club Atlético Atlanta footballers
La Liga players
Segunda División players
Segunda División B players
Elche CF players
Atlético Madrid footballers
CD Tenerife players
Rayo Vallecano players
Spain international footballers
1978 FIFA World Cup players
Sportspeople from Mendoza Province